Stare Błonowo  is a village in the administrative district of Gmina Łasin, within Grudziądz County, Kuyavian-Pomeranian Voivodeship, in north-central Poland.

The village has a population of 300.

History
During the German occupation of Poland (World War II), Stare Błonowo was one of the sites of executions of Poles, carried out by the Germans in 1939 as part of the Intelligenzaktion.

References

Villages in Grudziądz County